A Song Will Rise is the fourth studio album by the American folk music trio Peter, Paul & Mary, released in 1965.

Track listing 
All tracks are composed by Noel Paul Stookey, Mary Travers, Peter Yarrow and Milt Okun, except where noted.

Personnel
Peter Yarrow – vocals, guitar
Noel Paul Stookey – vocals, guitar
Mary Travers – vocals

Chart positions

Notes 

Peter, Paul and Mary albums
1965 albums
Warner Records albums
Albums produced by Albert Grossman